Pilgrim (or Piligrim, from Latin Peregrinus, Pellegrinus, etc.) is a given name. It may refer to:

 Pilgrim I (archbishop of Salzburg) (died 923)
 Piligrim (died 991), bishop of Passau
 Pilgrim (archbishop of Cologne) (died 1036)
 Pellegrinus I of Aquileia (died 1161), also called Pilgrim of Ortenburg, patriarch of Aquileia
 Pellegrino II of Aquileia (died 1204), patriarch of Aquileia
 Pilgram Marpeck (died 1556), Anabaptist leader in southern Germany
 Pilgrim von Puchheim (died 1396), archbishop of Salzburg

Masculine given names